TV5 Cambodia is a terrestrial television channel in Cambodia.  It is owned by Thai billionaire Supachai Verapuchong.  The channel produces its own Cambodian dramas for programming. TV5 Cambodia is the first Cambodian television station to broadcast in digital.

References

External links
TV5 Official Website

Television stations in Cambodia
Mass media in Phnom Penh
Television channels and stations established in 1995